Palataka (Bengali: পলাতকা; English: "The Runaway" or "The Fugitive") is a Bengali poetry book written by Rabindranath Tagore Tagore. It was published in 1918. It consists of 15 poems.

Background 
There were mainly two points behind the writing of the book "Palataka". These are: (a) the political tensions and (b) the serious social  conditions of the Indian women. The book shows Tagore's rebellious nature and reflects his sensitivity about social life.

List of poems 
The poems of "Palataka" are:

 Palataka
 Phanki
 Mala
 Kalo meye
 Hariye-jaoya
 Chiradiner daga
 Mayer samman
 Bhola 
 Asol
 Shesh gaan
 Mukti
 Nishkriti
 Chinnyo patra
 Thakurdadar chuti
 Shesh pratistha

References

External links 

 Text on Bengali wikisource

 rabindra-rachanabali.nltr.org

1918 poetry books
Bengali poetry collections
Poetry collections by Rabindranath Tagore
Indian_poetry_books